Belo Polje is a village located in the municipality of Obrenovac, Belgrade, Serbia. As of 2011 census, it has a population of 1,836 inhabitants.

References

Suburbs of Belgrade